The Socialists.sk is a non-parliamentary left-wing political movement in Slovakia, which was established by registering on October 8, 2019 at the Ministry of the Interior. The aim of the movement is to promote values based on three basic pillars - social, environmental and peaceful. The movement is to bring a radical, left-wing democratic alternative to predatory capitalism, which destroys justice, equality and life on Earth. The current party leader is Artur Bekmatov.

History
The movement was founded in October 2019 by left-wing activist and former presidential candidate, Eduard Chmelár. Socialisti.sk ran independently in the 2020 parliamentary election, but failed, gaining 0.55% of the vote. Subsequently, Chmelár resigned as chairman and in June 2020 the party assembly elected Artur Bekmatov as the new chairman, Chmelár remained the honorary chairman.

Electoral results

National Council

Party leadership

Chairman
2019-2020 – Eduard Chmelár
2020–present – Artur Bekmatov

References

External links
Official site of the movement
Socialisti.sk in the Register of parties and movements of the Ministry of Interior of the SR

2019 establishments in Slovakia
Alter-globalization
Anti-militarism
Democratic socialist parties in Europe
Ecosocialist parties
Political parties established in 2019
Socialist parties in Slovakia
Syndicalist political parties